John Poe may refer to:

Johnnie Poe (born 1959), American football player
Johnny Poe (1874–1915), American football player, coach, US Marine, and soldier of fortune
John Poe (1980s–1990s), American drummer for Guadalcanal Diary (band)
John Poe (1862–1870s), American promoter and gold prospector; namesake of Poeville, Nevada
John P. Poe Sr. (1836–1909), American jurist and politician
SS John P. Poe, a Liberty ship